A test tube holder is used to hold test tubes. It is used for holding a test tube in place when the tube is hot or should not be touched. For example, a test tube holder can be used to hold a test tube while it is being heated. Moreover, when heating the tube with liquid or solid contained inside, the holder ought to tightly hold a test tube in order for the tube to be safely held while heating.

Particularly, for liquid heating, when holding a test tube holder with a test tube, hold it such that it aligns with the lab bench and also point the open end of the tube away from yourself or anyone nearby.

Additionally, while using a test tube holder, the proper distance between the test tube holder and the top of the test tube is approximately 3 centimetres.

Structure 
Structurally, jaws of a test tube holder are self-closed by a spring.

Purpose 
The purpose of a test tube holder is to be used only to hold a test tube as it is not structured for flasks or other heavier objects. It also is used when wanting to burn something small that cannot be held using your hand.

See also 
 Test tube
 Test tube rack

References 

Laboratory equipment
Holders